刀 is an East Asian word which means sabre, knife, or certain types of sword.

刀 may refer to:
Dao (sword), a category of single-edge Chinese swords primarily used for slashing and chopping
Japanese sword
Katana, a type of single-edged Japanese sword, used by the samurai
Kangxi Radical 18
The Blade, a 1995 Hong Kong film
slang term for US dollar

See also
剣 (disambiguation)